Jonathan Charles Smith (born 24 February 1979) is a motoring journalist and television presenter. He was one of the presenters on Channel 5 motoring programme Fifth Gear and has since presented Mud, Sweat & Gears for BBC America and Motorheads for BBC Worldwide. Smith first worked for a custom and vintage VW magazine, becoming the editor after three years. He went on to work for magazine publisher EMAP, where he wrote features for magazines such as Max Power, Car magazine, Revs and Classic Cars. Smith appeared on Sky One's Movies' Greatest Cars in 2005, where he was noticed by North One Television, producers of Fifth Gear, and subsequently asked to attend a screen test. Smith hosted his own engineering-based documentary television series, Industrial Junkie. In March 2014, he began filming a series with Tom Ford called Mud, Sweat & Gears: this was broadcast on BBC America during February and March 2015.

He is a former presenter of the web TV and podcast show Fully Charged which he presented until January 2020. Smith now creates videos for his YouTube channel, The Late Brake Show, which he describes as "a broad church of automotive appreciation".

Outside of television Smith remains a motoring journalist and enjoys classic and custom cars as a hobby. Having owned over 130 cars, he built a classic electric hot rod called 'Jonny's Flux Capacitor' which for a time claimed to be the world's quickest street legal EV. His other cars include a '68 Dodge Charger, a modified, re-engined, Honda VTEC powered Austin Allegro, a 1964 Chevrolet Impala SS, a Chevrolet Volt plug-in hybrid and a 1967 Volkswagen Beetle (his first car, owned since he took his driving test at 17).

References

External links
Fifth Gear Biography
YouTube Channel
Jonny's Site - Car Pervert
BBC America Mud, Sweat and Gears
Jonny's Flux Capacitor electric drag car
Fully Charged

Motoring journalists
Living people
1979 births
People from Taunton